Morgan Lea Brown (born 29 November 1999) is an English professional footballer who plays as a midfielder for Cypriot First Division side Aris Limassol.

Club career

Leicester
Brown was born in Leicester and joined the academy of local side Leicester City at the age of 7.

Aberdeen
In August 2018, he joined Scottish Premiership side Aberdeen after impressing on trial.  He made one appearance for Aberdeen U21s in the Scottish Challenge Cup in a 3–1 loss to Raith Rovers.

Stratford Town
In July 2019, he joined Southern League Premier Division Central side Stratford Town. He made two league appearances for the club before leaving.

Aris Limassol
He joined the Cyprus team Aris Limassol in August 2019 and could not play because the league season was interrupted due to COVID-19 pandemic. He played 19 games for Aris Limassol in the 2021-22 season and did not contribute to a goal.  In June 2022, he renewed his contract with Aris Limassol and signed for 3 years. In the 2022-23 season, he has contributed 2 goals in 17 matches played in all lanes for Aris Limassol so far.   He received the award for the best goal of the 11th week of the season with his great goal.

Career statistics

Club

References

External links

 Sofascore Profile

1999 births
Living people
English footballers
Association football midfielders
Footballers from Leicester
Southern Football League players
Cypriot First Division players
Cypriot Second Division players
Leicester City F.C. players
Aberdeen F.C. players
Stratford Town F.C. players
Aris Limassol FC players
English expatriate footballers
English expatriate sportspeople in Cyprus
Expatriate footballers in Cyprus